"Your Disease" is a song by the band Saliva and is from the band's second album Every Six Seconds. The song was featured in the Dracula 2000 movie soundtrack, 2002 video game Aggressive Inline, and 2003 video game Downhill Domination.

Meaning
The song is about a "relationship gone wrong and how things can go bad real fast when there is manipulation and sex involved," former Saliva vocalist Josey Scott said. Scott also said, "People's emotions can get pretty tangled. I'd say a lot of our songs are relationship-oriented, and not just because everybody can identify with it, either. It's about being honest."

Chart positions

References

External links
 

Saliva (band) songs
2001 songs
Song recordings produced by Bob Marlette
Island Records singles
2000 singles
Songs written by Josey Scott